Kapsowar is a Town in Elgeyo-Marakwet County, Kenya. Prior to March 2013, it was located in the former Rift Valley Province. In 1994, Kapsowar became the headquarters of the former Marakwet District. Prior to this, the Marakwet and Keiyo tribes were collectively grouped into the Elgeiyo-Markwet District. In 2010, the two districts were again merged into Elgeyo-Marakwet County. The Marakwet number approximately 200,000 and are a part of the Kalenjin family of tribes, which collectively are the second-largest ethnic group in Kenya.

The town is located between the Kerio Valley and the Cherangani Hills. The land surrounding Kapsowar is fertile and the elevation creates a mild climate with a temperature range of 70-85 °F (21–29 °C). Kapsowar has a population of 82645 2019 census, total population of Kapsowar town Town). AIC Kapsowar Hospital, established by Africa Inland Mission in 1933, is largely responsible for the degree of development presently seen in the town.

Clans
The original inhabitants of Kapsowar originate from multiple clans, including Kapterik, Talai and Kapswahili. The Kapswahili originally immigrated from Tanzania and were more or less absorbed by the Kapterik clan. Despite high rates of intermarriage most Kapswahili have retained their Swahili names. The Talai and Kapterik are rival clans. The former is predominantly Protestant and the latter Catholic. They tend to support rival candidates in parliamentary and local elections. Cultural, political and religious differences distinguish the Kapterik and the Talai clans. These are understood to predate the arrival of Christian missionaries. The Kapterik are a large clan who have relatives both in Kapsowar and neighbouring areas and extend to the Kerio Valley. Those in the valley migrated to the larger Kapsowar area because of the mild climate and better possibilities of farming and animal husbandry. This displeased the Talai because of resource competition.

Missionary influence 
The second and more prominent cause of these rivalries started when the Christian missionaries arrived. Two groups showed up in the pre-colonial period: Protestant English missionaries and Irish Catholic missionaries. These two groups brought animosities with them from Europe. They used two differing methods: the English used an assimilation policy to win followers. This meant convincing the locals to abandon their traditional way of life (polygamy, traditional alcoholic drinks, traditional weddings, circumcision etc.). Converts were given privileges such as running facilities brought by the missionaries. They established the Kapsowar hospital, schools and many other benefits to convince followers. This convinced the Talai. Reports claimed that non-converts were denied treatment in Kapsowar hospital in the 1970s. The Irish used an integration policy. They converted especially the traditionally conservative Kapterik to Catholicism and did not require them to abandon their traditions. The Kapterik continued to practice a more traditional lifestyle.

Cultural practices 
Kapterik boys and girls were circumcised (female genital mutilation is practiced in the greater Kapsowar area). Traditional circumcision involved an initiation ritual where boys are taught traditions, undergo a bravery test and learn a coded language (understandable only to initiated boys with a word assortment mostly not traceable to the usual Marakwet language but with the usual grammar). With this language, a person speaking fluent Marakwet who has not passed this traditional rite may be present during a conversation in the coded language but would not comprehend it. Those who have not passed this rite and have undergone circumcision in the hospital were referred to as kaplinsi, after white missionary Dr. Robert Stanley Lindsay who worked at  Kapsowar mission hospital worked to convince the Talai clan to have their boys circumcised in hospital and not in the bush. The Catholic Church in Marakwet was thereby considered liberal and the Protestant church conservative, a reversal of opinion in Europe.

Kapsowar Hospital 

Kapsowar Hospital was established by the Africa Inland Mission (AIM) in 1933 and transferred to the supervision of the Africa Inland Church Central Health Council.

The hospital and its 126 beds serve the Marakwet tribe. It offers four dispensaries that provide essential healthcare. The hospital offers antiretroviral therapy, curative in-patient services, family planning, HIV counseling and testing as well as immunizations. Among the approximately 4,000 inpatient admissions and 15,000 outpatient visits per year, the most common diagnoses for children constitute pneumonia, malaria, gastrointestinal infections, meningitis, and injuries/fractures. The majority of the diseases are communicable, including HIV/AIDS, lower respiratory tract infections, malaria, diarrheal diseases, neonatal preterm births, measles and tuberculosis.

Common emergency cases include child delivery, traumatic injuries, pelvic bleeding, intestinal obstruction, and peritonitis. Surgical procedures include thyroidectomy, tonsillectomy, vagotomy, pyloroplasty, chronic osteomyelitis amputation, hysterectomy, tubal ligation, C-section and eye surgery.

The Africa Inland Mission (AIM) established Kapsowar hospital with the primary goal of spreading the Gospel. The Mission made an agreement with the elders of Talai, Marakwet to purchase the Old Government offices, ‘boma’, for the hospital. This represented a step forward in fostering relations between the church and the inhabitants.

On October 19, 1934, the first dispensary opened under the supervision of Reverend Reynolds. In September 1934, Dr. Lee Ashton and his physician wife joined the facility. Near the end of the year, the first Marakwet woman came in for childbirth.

Difficulties in finishing the hospital began to arise as the missionaries themselves became patients. In April 1938, Reverend Reynolds and his wife went on leave due to illness. Dr. Ashley had to serve as superintendent of the Mission station and Africa Inland Missions Schools as well as offering medical services. Various missionaries came to substitute for their previous partners: Mr. and Mrs. Powley, Reverend and Mrs. Richardson, Dr. and Mrs. W. B. Young, Dr. Robert Stanley Lindsay, nurse Banks and Dr. Phillip Morris. During the 1939 -1945, some missionaries were instructed to render their services. The Local Native Council was advised to take over the dispensary due  irregularities of the missionaries.

By the end of 1949, about seven African women, not from Marakwet, were in nurse training along with five male dressers. The missionaries began training the locals to take over their roles. As Dr. Morris noted, “ an African Christian who has received training at Kapsowar Hospital can lead charge of the dispensary. He is encouraged to have his wife and family with him and live in the midst of his tribe; he has the opportunity daily of preaching the word and healing the sick. The success of these very isolated areas depends upon the individual African - his spirituality and his ability.”

References

Elgeyo-Marakwet County
Populated places in Rift Valley Province